Nikolai Vavilov is a 1990 6-part biographical television film. Joint production of the USSR and East Germany. Biopic devoted to the history of the life of Soviet biologist, academician Nikolai Vavilov.

Plot 
History of life, contribution to science and social activities of academician Nikolai Ivanovich Vavilov. His scientific and personal confrontation with Trofim Lysenko, the subsequent arrest and death of the scientist in prison.

Cast 
 Kostas Smoriginas as Nikolai Vavilov
 Andrey Martynov as Sergey Vavilov
 Irina Kupchenko as Nikolai Vavilov's second wife Yelena    
 Bohdan Stupka as Trofim Lysenko
 Sergey Gazarov as Isaac Present
 Georgy Kavtaradze as Stalin
Tamara Degtyaryova as Katya, Nikolai Vavilov's first wife  
 Sergey Plotnikov as Ivan Ilyich,   father of  brothers Vavilovs
 Nikolai Lavrov as Professor Oleg Avdeev
 Ingeborga Dapkūnaitė as Natalia Karlovna Lemke, Nikolai Vavilov's secretary 
 Vyacheslav Ezepov as Andrei Zhdanov
 Rim Ayupov as Vyacheslav Abramovich Terentyev
 Nina Usatova as  collective farm chairman
 Igor Ivanov as Semyon Petrovich Scheludko
 Elizaveta Nikischihina as Terentyeva
 Georgy Sahakyan as double Stalin

Episodes
1.) Family
2.) Secretary
3.) Bodyguard
4.) Wife
5.) Eldest Son
6.) Bonfire

References

External links

 Nikolai Vavilov at the Kino-Teatr.ru

1990 films
1990s biographical drama films
Soviet biographical drama films
Television series set in the 20th century
Biographical films about scientists
1990 television films
Soviet television films
Mosfilm films
1990 drama films
Russian-language television shows